Strength in Numb333rs is the debut studio album by the American rock band Fever 333, released on January 18, 2019.

History
On November 9, 2018, the band released a music video for their new single "Burn It" along with announcing their debut album, "Strength in Numb333rs", with a release date of January 18, 2019.

Reception 

Strength in Numb333rs received critical acclaim upon release. Wall of Sound gave the album a rating of 9/10 and wrote: "Strength in Numb333rs won't change the landscape for music in 2019 but it may well shape a generation to make better decisions." It was also voted the "Best Album of 2019" by the subscribers to online publication 91 Suns. Loudwire named it one of the 50 best rock albums of 2019.

Track listing

Notes
 All tracks are stylized in all caps.

Personnel
Fever 333
Jason Aalon Butler – lead vocals, guitars, bass, percussion, lyrics
Stephen Harrison – guitars, backing vocals
Aric Improta – drums

Additional
John Feldmann - guitars, bass, production, writing
Travis Barker - drums, drum programming, production, writing
Zakk Cervini - guitars, bass, engineering, mixing, writing
Matt Pauling - guitars, bass, engineering, writing
Chris Athens - mastering
Neal Avron - mixing
Jon Lundin - engineering
Matt Malpass - engineering
Nik Tretiakov - engineering
Nick Furlong - writing
Simon Wilcox - additional vocals
Jayden Allen - additional vocals
Milla Feldmann - additional vocals
Emi Allen - additional vocals

Charts

References 

2019 debut albums
Fever 333 albums
Roadrunner Records albums
Albums produced by John Feldmann
Albums produced by Travis Barker